Johnny Guitar is a 1954 American Western film directed by Nicholas Ray and starring Joan Crawford, Sterling Hayden, Mercedes McCambridge, Ernest Borgnine and Scott Brady. It was produced and distributed by Republic Pictures. The screenplay was adapted from a novel of the same name by Roy Chanslor.

In 2008, Johnny Guitar was selected for preservation in the United States National Film Registry by the Library of Congress as being "culturally, historically, or aesthetically significant".

Plot
On the outskirts of a wind-swept Arizona cattle town, an aggressive and strong-willed saloonkeeper named Vienna maintains a volatile relationship with the local cattlemen and townsfolk. Not only does she support the railroad being laid nearby (the cattlemen oppose it), but she permits "The Dancin' Kid" (her former amour) and his confederates to frequent her saloon.

The locals, led by John McIvers and egged on by Emma Small (a onetime rival of Vienna for the Dancin' Kid's affections) are determined to force Vienna out of town, and the hold-up of the stage (erroneously blamed on the Dancin' Kid) offers a perfect pretext.

Vienna faces them down, helped by the mysterious and just-arrived Johnny Guitar, a guitar-player who had an interview scheduled with her that day. McIvers gives Vienna, Johnny Guitar, and Dancin' Kid and his sidekicks 24 hours to leave. Johnny turns out to be Vienna's ex-lover and a reformed gunslinger whose real name is Johnny Logan. A smoldering love/hate relationship develops.

Dancin' Kid and his gang rob the town bank, while Vienna is there by coincidence, to fund their escape to California, but the pass is blocked by a railroad crew dynamiting a way in, and they flee back to their secret hideout (a played-out silver mine) behind a waterfall. Emma convinces the townsfolk that Vienna is as guilty as the rest, and the posse rides to her saloon.

Vienna appears to be getting the best of another verbal confrontation when one of the wounded bank robbers, a youth named Turkey, is discovered under a table. Emma persuades the men to hang Vienna and Turkey, and burns the saloon down. At the last second Vienna, though not Turkey, is saved from hanging by Johnny Guitar. Vienna and Johnny escape the posse and find refuge in Dancin' Kid's secret hideaway.

The posse tracks them down, and the last two of Kid's men are killed by infighting; one, Bart, is killed by Johnny when Bart was going to betray and shoot the Kid. A halt is called to the bloodbath by the posse's leader, McIvers. Emma challenges Vienna to a showdown and shoots Vienna in the shoulder; Dancin' Kid calls to Emma but is killed by a bullet to the head fired by the angered and insanely jealous Emma. Vienna then shoots Emma in the head. The posse allows Johnny and Vienna to leave the hideout in peace, watching them go.

Cast
 Joan Crawford as Vienna 
 Sterling Hayden as Johnny Guitar (Johnny Logan) 
 Mercedes McCambridge as Emma Small 
 Scott Brady as The Dancin' Kid 
 Ward Bond as John McIvers 
 Ben Cooper as Turkey Ralston 
 Ernest Borgnine as Bart Lonergan 
 John Carradine as Old Tom 
 Royal Dano as Corey 
 Frank Ferguson as Marshal Williams 
 Paul Fix as Eddie 
 Rhys Williams as Mr. Andrews 
 Ian MacDonald as Pete
 Robert Osterloh as Sam

Production
Crawford and Nick Ray were scheduled to make a film called Lisbon at Paramount, but the script proved unacceptable. Crawford, who held the film rights to the novel Johnny Guitar, which its author Roy Chanslor had dedicated to her, brought the script to Republic and had the studio hire Ray to direct an adaptation of it.

Crawford wanted either Bette Davis or Barbara Stanwyck for the role of Emma Small, but they were too expensive. Claire Trevor was next in mind for the role but was unable to accept because she was tied up with another film. Finally, Nicholas Ray brought in McCambridge.

Most people claimed Crawford was easy to work with, always professional, generous, patient and kind. Issues between Crawford and McCambridge cropped up early on, but Ray was not alarmed – at first. He found it "heaven sent" that they disliked each other and felt it added greatly to the dramatic conflict. The reasons for the feud appear to date back to a time when Crawford had once dated McCambridge's husband, Fletcher Markle. According to some of the other co-stars, McCambridge needled Crawford about it. McCambridge also appears to have disliked that Crawford and Ray were in the midst of an affair. Crawford, on the other hand, disliked what she perceived to be "special attention" that Ray was giving to McCambridge.

Making things worse was that McCambridge was battling alcoholism during this period, something she admitted later contributed to the problems between her and Crawford.

After filming, McCambridge and Hayden publicly declared their dislike of Crawford, with McCambridge labeling Crawford, "a mean, tipsy, powerful, rotten-egg lady". Hayden said in an interview, "There is not enough money in Hollywood to lure me into making another picture with Joan Crawford. And I like money."   

Crawford for her part said of McCambridge, "I have four children – I do not need a fifth."
	
Later, Ray claimed that Crawford, during a rage, drunkenly threw McCambridge's costumes into the street. Crawford later laughingly admitted she had thrown McCambridge's own clothing into the street. Ray also said of that time, "Joan was drinking a lot and she liked to fight," but that she was also "very attractive, with a basic decency."

Home media
On September 20, 2016, Olive Films released the film on Blu-Ray and DVD as part of its lineup, Olive Signature. The release features an archival introduction from Martin Scorsese, an audio commentary from Geoff Andrews, and several featurettes.

Reception

Box office
During its initial theatrical run, Johnny Guitar had grossed $2.5 million in North American rentals. According to Kinematograph Weekly the film was a "money maker" at the British box office in 1954.

Critical reaction
Variety commented, "It proves [Crawford] should leave saddles and Levis to someone else and stick to city lights for a background. [The film] is only a fair piece of entertainment. [The scriptwriter] becomes so involved with character nuances and neuroses, all wrapped up in dialogue, that [the picture] never has a chance to rear up in the saddle... The people in the story never achieve much depth, this character shallowness being at odds with the pretentious attempt at analysis to which the script and direction devotes so much time." Bosley Crowther of The New York Times singled out Crawford's physical appearance, stating "no more femininity comes from her than from the rugged Heflin in Shane. For the lady, as usual, is as sexless as the lions on the public library steps and as sharp and romantically forbidding as a package of unwrapped razor blades." He further commented that the film was no more than a "flat walk-through — or occasional ride-through—of western cliches...The color is slightly awful and the Arizona scenery is only fair. Let's put it down as a fiasco. Miss Crawford went that away."

Harrison's Reports praised the film as "one of the better pictures of its type. Filmed in what is without question the best example of Trucolor photography yet shown, its mixture of romance, hatred and violence grips one's attention throughout, in spite of the fact that it is overburdened with a number of 'talky' passages. This, however, is not a serious flaw and could be corrected by some judicious cutting of the rather overlong running time."

Critical re-evaluation 
According to Martin Scorsese, contemporary American audiences "didn't know what to make of it, so they either ignored it or laughed at it." European audiences, on the other hand, not having the same biases as American audiences, saw Johnny Guitar for what it was: "an intense, unconventional, stylized picture, full of ambiguities and subtexts that rendered it extremely modern." During its release overseas, the film found acclaim by then-critics Jean-Luc Godard and François Truffaut who wrote reviews in the French film magazine Cahiers du Cinéma. Truffaut further described the film as the "Beauty and the Beast of Westerns, a Western dream". He was especially impressed by the film's extravagance: the bold colors, the poetry of the dialogue in certain scenes, and the theatricality which results in cowboys vanishing and dying "with the grace of ballerinas".

In his 1988 release Women on the Verge of a Nervous Breakdown, Spanish director Pedro Almodóvar paid homage to the film. His lead character Pepa Marcos (Carmen Maura), a voice artist, passes out while dubbing Vienna's voice in a scene where Johnny (voiced earlier by Pepa's ex-lover Iván) and Vienna banter about their conflicted past. Almodóvar's film also ends with a chase and an obsessed woman shooting at his lead character. In 2012, Japanese film director Shinji Aoyama listed Johnny Guitar as one of the Greatest Films of All Time. He said, "Johnny Guitar is the only movie that I'd like to remake someday, although I know that it's impossible. It's probably closest to the worst nightmare I can have. I know for sure that my desire to remake this movie comes from my warped thought that I want to remake my own nightmare."

On the review aggregate website Rotten Tomatoes, the film has an approval rating of 93% with an average score of 8.52/10 based on 45 critics. The website's critical consensus reads: "Johnny Guitar confidently strides through genre conventions, emerging with a brilliant statement that transcends its period setting -- and left an indelible mark."

The film is recognized by American Film Institute in these lists:
 2003: AFI's 100 Years...100 Heroes & Villains:
 Emma Small – Nominated Villain
 2008: AFI's 10 Top 10:
 Nominated Western Film

Adaptations
Johnny Guitar was adapted into a stage musical, which debuted Off-Broadway in 2004, with a book by American television producer Nicholas van Hoogstraten, lyrics by Joel Higgins, and music by Martin Silvestri and Joel Higgins.

In popular culture
 The film is seen briefly in Women on the Verge of a Nervous Breakdown as the characters portrayed by Carmen Maura and Fernando Guillén are dubbers for the film into Spanish.
 Vienna and Jill McBain (Claudia Cardinale) of Sergio Leone's Once Upon a Time in the West have similar backstories (both may be former prostitutes who become saloonkeepers), and both own land where a train station will be built because of access to water. Also, Harmonica (Charles Bronson), like Sterling Hayden's title character, is a mysterious, gunslinging outsider known by his musical nickname. Some of West'''s central plot (Western settlers vs. the railroad company) may be recycled from Johnny Guitar.
 While on the run, the murderous couple in François Truffaut's Mississippi Mermaid (La Sirène du Mississippi), played by Jean-Paul Belmondo and Catherine Deneuve, go to a showing of Johnny Guitar in Lyon and discuss the film in the street afterwards.
 In Bonanza, episode 12.1, "The Night Virginia City Died", Vienna's bar is burned down for the umpteenth time. The footage is spectacular, and appears to have been used in many films and TV shows.
 In the 1971 western spoof Support Your Local Gunfighter, Cooper parodies his own role as a young gunslinger in over his head.
In the Sunn O))) album, White1, the song "My Wall" frequently mentions Johnny Guitar in its lyrics.
The movie is mentioned by the main hero of Jean-Luc Godard's 10th feature film, Pierrot Le Fou (1965) and in La Chinoise (1967) by Henri, who gets expelled from the revolutionary cell for defending the movie. In Weekend (1967), 'Johnny Guitar' is a call sign uttered into a walkie-talkie. 
Shots from the movie are used in Guy Debord's The Society of the Spectacle.
The title song is heard on radios throughout the Mojave wasteland in the videogame Fallout: New Vegas''.

References

External links
Johnny Guitar essay by Michael Schlesinger on the National Film Registry website
Johnny Guitar essay by Daniel Eagan in America's Film Legacy: The Authoritative Guide to the Landmark Movies in the National Film Registry, A&C Black, 2010 , pages 485-486
Johnny Guitar Musical official website
 Brian W. Fairbanks in angelfire
 
 
 
 

1954 Western (genre) films
1954 films
American Western (genre) films
Films about bank robbery
Films based on American novels
Films directed by Nicholas Ray
Films scored by Victor Young
1950s feminist films
Films set in Arizona
Republic Pictures films
Revisionist Western (genre) films
Trucolor films
United States National Film Registry films
1950s English-language films
1950s American films